The blacktip grouper (Epinephelus fasciatus), also known as the redbanded grouper, blacktipped cod, black-tipped rockcod, footballer cod, red-barred cod, red-barred rockcod, scarlet rock-cod or weathered rock-cod, is a species of marine ray-finned fish, a grouper from the subfamily Epinephelinae which is part of the family Serranidae, which also includes the anthias and sea basses. It is found in the tropical Indo-Pacific region. It is the type species of the genus Epinephelus.

Description
The blacktip grouper has a body which has a standard length which is around 2.8 to 3.3 times its depth. The area between the yes is flat but the dorsal profile of the head is convex. The rounded preopercle has a finely serrated rear margin with he lowest serrations slightly enlarged. The upper edge of the gill cover is straight. The dorsal fin contains 11 spines and 15-17 soft rays while the anal fin has 3 spines and 8 soft rays. The membranes between the dorsal fin spines are deeply indented. The caudal fin is moderately rounded. There are 49-75 scales in the lateral line. The colour is variable and ranges from pale greenish grey to pale reddish yellow to scarlet. They frequently have 5 or 6 faint dark bars, the final one being on the caudal peduncle. The scales on the upper body have a pale centre and dark rear margin, which creates am indistinct checked pattern. The outer membrane of the spiny part of the dorsal fin is black, or dark red in specimens from Western Australia and some from deep water. There is a pale yellow or white spot to the rear of the tip of each of the dorsal fin spines.

Distribution
The blacktip grouper has a wide Indo-Pacific distribution. Its range extends from the Red Sea to the Eastern Cape in South Africa east as far as the Pitcairn Islands, north to southern Japan and Korea and south to New Caledonia and Australia. It is found in the Madagascar, Mascarenes, Comoros and the Seychelles in the Indian Ocean as well. In Australia it occurs from the Houtman Abrolhos in Western Australia north around the tropical coastline and then as far south as Port Hacking in New South Wales. It can also be found on reefs in the Coral Sea, Elizabeth Reef, around Lord Howe Island in the Tasman Sea and Christmas Island. A single record was reported in 2012 from the eastern Mediterranean Sea, off Lebanon.

Biology
This species may present simultaneous hermaphroditism in smaller individuals, while the large individuals usually lose female function.

The blacktip grouper feeds on crustaceans and smaller fishes by ambushing them.  It is found associated with coral reefs from 4 m deep (more commonly from 15 m) up to 160 m, in both marine and brackish water, sometimes in groups of 10-15 individuals. Juveniles may find shelter in mangrove swamps.

Blacktip groupers of the Red Sea are fished by the Bedouin. It has also been associated with ciguatera poisoning.

Parasites

Blacktip groupers are host of several parasites, including Pseudorhabdosynochus spp. (diplectanid Monogeneans) on the gills. The philometrid nematode Philometra fasciati is parasitic in the ovary of female fish; the adult female parasite is a red worm which can reach up to 40 centimetres in length, for a diameter of only 1.6 millimetre; the males are tiny.
Raphidascaris (Ichthyascaris) fasciati is a nematode parasitic in the intestine, 20 mm in length, described in 2020 and named after the fish.

Taxonomy
The blacktip grouper was first formally described as Perca fasciata in 1775 by the Swedish speaking Finnish born explorer Peter Forsskål (1732-1763) with the type locality given as Ras Muhammad in the southern Sinai Peninsula of Egypt. The German naturalist Marcus Elieser Bloch (1723–1799) created the new genus Epinephelus when he described E. marginalis in 1793, however E. marginalis is a synonym of Perca fasciata and this means that this species is the type species of its genus.

Gallery

References

External links
  Wildscreen Archive
 

blacktip grouper
Fish of the Red Sea
Fish of the Pacific Ocean
blacktip grouper